Benjamin Slade may refer to:

Sir Benjamin Slade, 7th Baronet (born 1946), baronet and businessman
Ben Slade (born 1976), television personality